Gordon N. Hintz (born November 29, 1973) is an American public servant and Democratic politician from Oshkosh, Wisconsin.  He was the minority leader in the Wisconsin State Assembly from 2017 through 2021.  He was a member of the Assembly for eight terms, representing the 54th Assembly district from 2007 through 2022.

Early life and career
Hintz was born in Oshkosh, Wisconsin, and graduated from Oshkosh North High School in 1992.  He obtained a B.A. from Hamline University, in Saint Paul, Minnesota, and went on to earn his Masters of Public Administration from the Robert M. La Follette School of Public Affairs at the University of Wisconsin–Madison.

Prior to serving in the Legislature, Hintz worked in government at the federal, state, and local levels. Hintz worked on the 1996 U.S. Senate campaign of Paul Wellstone before going to work for U.S. Senator Herb Kohl and former U.S. Representative Jay W. Johnson as a Legislative Staff Assistant in Washington, D.C. Hintz also served as a Research Assistant for Governor Tommy Thompson's Commission on State and Local Partnerships for the 21st Century (Kettl Commission) and worked as a Management Assistant and Budget Analyst for the City of Long Beach, California.

Legislative career
Hintz first ran for the Wisconsin State Assembly in 2004, and lost. In 2006 Hintz made another attempt, this time winning the open seat.

In September 2017, after 10 years in the Assembly, Hintz was elected by the Democratic caucus to serve as their next floor leader, following Representative Peter Barca's announcement that he would stand down from the role.

On March 3, 2022, he announced that he would not seek re-election.

Controversies
In the midst of the 2011 protests, on February 10, 2011, Hintz was found guilty of solicitation of prostitution. He was also ticketed by police for sexual misconduct at Heavenly Touch Massage Parlor in Appleton, Wisconsin. Police had been investigating the business because it was suspected of prostitution. Hintz pleaded no contest to sexual misconduct and paid a fine of $2,032, according to a news report in the Milwaukee Journal Sentinel. He said he made "a bad decision" that "was out of character" and apologized for disappointing his family, friends, and community. He also sought to refocus attention on the important issues then facing the state, saying "My concern right now is that my personal situation is distracting from the much more important issue facing our state. We have tens of thousands of working people at the Capitol every day, and that must remain our focus."

Hintz publicly berated a female colleague in 2011 and was forced to make an apology. He apologized on February 28, 2011, for comments directed at fellow legislator, Republican State Representative Michelle Litjens during a heated backroom debate, after Republicans allegedly broke procedural rules to end a 58-hour debate on the contentious Budget Repair Bill. Litjens said she did not take the comments personally and thought they were directed at all Republicans but thought he should be disciplined by the Assembly.

Hintz was involved in an expletive-laced Facebook exchange on May 28, 2019, with a former friend in both public and private messages that were later provided to the Milwaukee Journal Sentinel by the friend and made public. Hintz apologized, stating, "But I need to move on and let it go, and say I'm sorry today happened".

Other
Hintz placed second in the 2003 National Air Guitar championships under the pseudonym, "Krye Tuff". He appears in the documentary Air Guitar Nation about the 2003 championships.

Electoral history

| colspan="6" style="text-align:center;background-color: #e9e9e9;"| General Election, November 2, 2004

| colspan="6" style="text-align:center;background-color: #e9e9e9;"| General Election, November 7, 2006

References

External links
 Representative Gordon Hintz at Wisconsin Legislature
 Gordon Hintz for State Assembly official campaign website
 
 

Campaign 2008 campaign contributions at Wisconsin Democracy Campaign

|-

1973 births
2008 United States presidential electors
21st-century American politicians
Hamline University alumni
Living people
Democratic Party members of the Wisconsin State Assembly
Politicians from Oshkosh, Wisconsin
Robert M. La Follette School of Public Affairs alumni